German submarine U-622 was a Type VIIC U-boat built for Nazi Germany's Kriegsmarine for service during World War II.
She was laid down on 1 July 1941 by Blohm & Voss, Hamburg, as yard number 598, launched on 19 March 1942 and commissioned on 14 May 1942 under Oberleutnant zur See Horst-Thilo Queck.

Design
German Type VIIC submarines were preceded by the shorter Type VIIB submarines. U-622 had a displacement of  when at the surface and  while submerged. She had two shafts and two  propellers.

U-622 was fitted with five  torpedo tubes (four fitted at the bow and one at the stern), fourteen torpedoes, one  SK C/35 naval gun, 220 rounds, and a  C/30 anti-aircraft gun. The boat had a complement of between forty-four and sixty.

Service history
The boat's career began with training at 8th U-boat Flotilla on 14 May 1942, followed by active service on 2 October 1942 as part of the 11th Flotilla until 31 May 1943, when she then transferred to 13th Flotilla on 1 June 1943 for the remainder of her service.

In four patrols she sank no ships.

Wolfpacks
U-622 took part in one wolfpack, namely:
 Nordwind (24 – 28 January 1943)

Fate
U-622 was sunk on 24 July 1943 near Trondheim in position , by American B-17 bombers of the 95th Bomb Group. It was one of the only U-boats sunk by high-level bombing during World War II.

References

Bibliography

External links

German Type VIIC submarines
1942 ships
U-boats commissioned in 1942
U-boats sunk in 1943
U-boats sunk by US aircraft
World War II shipwrecks in the Norwegian Sea
World War II submarines of Germany
Ships built in Hamburg
Maritime incidents in July 1943